Coles Van Vechten Veeder (July 4, 1867 – December 4, 1942) was a United States district judge of the United States District Court for the Eastern District of New York.

Early life
Born in Schenectady, New York,  Veeder was the son of John Wynkoop Veeder (1822–1899) and his second wife, Margaret (nee Van Vechten) Veeder (1844–1916). 

Veeder attended Columbia University and the University of Virginia. At the latter, he was a member of the Fraternity of Delta Psi (aka St. Anthony Hall). He read law in 1890, and received an M.A. from Union College (now Albany Law School).

Career

He worked in private practice in Chicago, Illinois until 1900, and subsequently in New York City, New York until 1911.

On January 13, 1911, Veeder was nominated by President William Howard Taft to a new seat on the United States District Court for the Eastern District of New York created by 36 Stat. 838. He was confirmed by the United States Senate on January 26, 1911, and received his commission the same day. Veeder's service was terminated on December 31, 1917, due to his resignation.

Following his resignation from the federal bench, Veeder returned to private practice in New York City until 1942. He served as counsel to the West Chicago Street Rail Road Company, and as Special Master for the United States Circuit Court of Appeals in 1935.

Personal life
On June 30, 1909, in Hurley, New York, Veeder married his third cousin Margaret Lounsbery DeWitt (1875–1956). She was the daughter of Abraham Gaasbeek DeWitt and Sarah (nee Lounsberry) DeWitt. They were both descendants of Louis DuBois (Huguenot). Van Vechten and Margaret had two children: John Van Vechten Veeder (1910–1976) and Margaret DeWitt Veeder (1914–1989). 

He died on December 4, 1942, in New York City.

References

External links
 

1867 births
1942 deaths
Judges of the United States District Court for the Eastern District of New York
United States district court judges appointed by William Howard Taft
20th-century American judges
United States federal judges admitted to the practice of law by reading law
Columbia University alumni
University of Virginia alumni
Albany Law School alumni
St. Anthony Hall
People from Schenectady County, New York